Tripi is a town and commune in Sicily, Italy.

Tripi may also refer to:

Filippo Tripi (born 2002), Italian footballer

See also
Trippi (disambiguation)
 Tripy Makonda (born 1990), French footballer